Silver Lake State Park is a public recreation area covering  that border Lake Michigan and Silver Lake,  west of Mears in Oceana County, Michigan.

Features
The park grounds include the Little Sable Point Light on Lake Michigan and one mile of shoreline on  Silver Lake.

History
The park originated in 1920 when 25 acres on the east side of Silver Lake were donated for park purposes by Carrie E. Mears, the daughter of lumber baron Charles Mears. In 1926, the federal government transferred 900 acres to the state, which became Sand Dunes State Park in 1949. Based upon a 1949 master plan, the two were merged, with Silver Lake State Park seeing its new boundaries dedicated in 1951.

Activities and amenities
The park's recreational opportunities include camping, hunting, swimming, hiking, boating, fishing, picnicking, and off-road vehicle driving. Piping plovers nest in the northern portion of the ORV area.

See also
 Dune bashing

References

External links

Silver Lake State Park Michigan Department of Natural Resources
Silver Lake State Park Map Michigan Department of Natural Resources

Dunes of Michigan
State parks of Michigan
Protected areas of Oceana County, Michigan
Protected areas established in 1920
1920 establishments in Michigan
Landforms of Oceana County, Michigan